The Visconti Castle in Pandino (Castello Visconteo di Pandino) is a 14th-century castle located in the center of the town of Pandino, province of Cremona, region of Lombardy, Italy. It was built by Bernabò Visconti and his wife, Beatrice Regina della Scala, between 1355 and 1361. Today it essentially retains its original forms.

History

Visconti and Sforza period 
In 1355, Bernabò Visconti, Lord of Milan, and his wife Regina Della Scala commissioned a castle at Pandino. They conceived the building as a courteous residence open to the landscape more than a fortification.  

The castle is quadrilateral in plan with corner towers and an internal courtyard with a hemming ground-floor portico with stout brick columns with pointed arches. A loggia with denser simple columns overlooks the courtyard on the upper floor.

Externally, it has single windows on the ground floor and mullioned pointed windows on the upper floor. A moat surrounded the castle. 

In the 15th century, the Visconti were replaced by the Sforza. Other defensive structures, including two towers, were added to the castle's entrances.

Subsequent owners  
After the Sforza period, the castle changed hands a few times until 1552, when the Marchese D'Adda acquired it. It remained the property of this family until the 19th century. The castle slowly deteriorated and was finally used to house farmers' families and for agricultural storage. In the 20th century, two corner towers fell into ruin.  

In 1947, it was purchased by the Pandino municipality, which initiated the restoration. Subsequently, the restoration extended to the original paintings with the geometric motif of the quatrefoil containing the alternated coats of arms of the Visconti and Della Scala.

Today
Today the castle is the seat of the municipal offices. Of the four towers of the original building, only those of the eastern wing has remained intact. The interior retains the frescoed decoration, including painted architecture and friezes that often include the symbols of Bernabò and Regina’s families.

References

Sources

External links
 Lombardia Beni Culturali – Castello di Pandino - Pandino (CR)
 Comune di Pandino – Il Castello Visconteo

Buildings and structures completed in 1355
Houses completed in the 14th century
Castles in Lombardy
Gothic architecture in Lombardy